Second Lieutenant Irving Banfield Corey  (August 30, 1892 – April 18, 1976) was a Canadian World War I flying ace credited with six aerial victories. He was awarded the Distinguished Flying Cross in the 1919 Birthday Honours.

Sources of information

References

1892 births
1976 deaths
Canadian World War I flying aces
Recipients of the Distinguished Flying Cross (United Kingdom)
People from Estrie